Ivdel (Mansi: Сапсаус, Sapsayas) is a town in Sverdlovsk Oblast, Russia, located on the Ivdel River (Ob's basin) near its confluence with the Lozva River,  north of Yekaterinburg, the administrative center of the oblast. Population:

History
Lozvinsky gorodok, the first Russian wooden fortress east of the Ural Mountains, was built in 1589 on the eastern bank of the Ivdel-Lozva river confluence, about 9 kilometres southeast of today's Ivdel. It was known as a gold-mining settlement of Nikito-Ivdel, and later Ivdel, since 1831. Ivdellag gulag was formed here in 1937. Town status was granted in 1943.

Administrative and municipal status
Within the framework of the administrative divisions, it is, together with the work settlement of Pelym and thirty-three rural localities, incorporated as the Town of Ivdel—an administrative unit with the status equal to that of the districts. As a municipal division, Ivdel and twenty-nine rural localities are incorporated as Ivdelsky Urban Okrug. The urban-type settlement of Pelym, together with four other rural localities, is incorporated separately as Pelym Urban Okrug.

Climate
Ivdel has a subarctic climate (Köppen climate classification Dfc), with very cold winters and warm summers. Precipitation is moderate and is somewhat higher in summer than at other times of the year.

References

Notes

Sources

External links

Official website of Ivdel 
Ivdel Business Directory 

Cities and towns in Sverdlovsk Oblast